Pamela Alexander (born 1948) is an American poet.

Life
She graduated from Bates College in 1970 and from the Iowa Writers' Workshop with a Master of Fine Arts in 1973.
She teaches at Oberlin College.

Her work has appeared in the New Yorker, Atlantic Monthly, Boston Book Review, Orion, TriQuarterly, Poetry, The Journal, New Republic, American Scholar.

Her papers are held at Bates College.

Awards
 1996 Iowa Poetry Prize
 1985 Yale Younger Poet award
 Fine Arts Work Center Fellowship
 Bunting Institute of Radcliffe College Fellowship
 Ohio Arts Council grant

Works
"Dingle Way", Perihelion

Anthologies
 
 
 The Extraordinary Tide
 American Voices
 Poetry for a Small Planet
 Cape Discovery

References

1948 births
Living people
American women poets
Bates College alumni
Iowa Writers' Workshop alumni
Oberlin College faculty
Yale Younger Poets winners
American women academics
21st-century American women